The 2016 Bulgarian Cup Final was the 76th final of the Bulgarian Cup. The final took place on 24 May 2016 at Vasil Levski National Stadium in Sofia in front of 33,345 spectators. It was refereed by Stanislav Todorov, from Shumen.

The clubs contesting the final were Montana and CSKA Sofia. CSKA won the match 1–0 with a goal from Stanislav Malamov, claiming their 20th Bulgarian Cup. The "redmen" were, however, not able to participate in the 2016-2017 edition of the UEFA Europa League due to a ban imposed by the UEFA Club Financial Control Body.

Background
CSKA Sofia were appearing in their 32nd Bulgarian Cup final and had won it on 19 of their previous 31 appearances. They also became only the fourth team from outside the A Group, since its foundation in 1948, to reach the final and the first team of third division.

For Montana, 2016 was their first appearance in a Bulgarian Cup final.

Route to the Final

Match

Details

Match overview
CSKA Sofia had more opportunities to score during the first half, with Montana starting to look more dangerous after the half hour mark. The unmarked Stanislav Malamov netted with a header what would turn out to be the winning goal in the 12th minute of the match after an Angel Granchov assist following a Boris Galchev corner kick. Momchil Tsvetanov and Preslav Yordanov then had chances to double CSKA's advantage, but their shots lacked accuracy. Ivan Minchev went close to finding an equalizer right before the half time break, with his free kick going just inches wide of the target.

Shortly after the resumption of the match, Ivaylo Vasilev pulled off a good save after a Granchov attempt. In the 57th minute, the goalscorer Malamov hit the right post and 13 minutes later he saw his powerful close distance shot saved by Vasilev. Montana threatened on a number of occasions after the 70th minute until a Stanislav Genchev goal was disallowed for offside on the 75' mark. In the 77th minute, manager Emil Velev was sent to the stands by Stanislav Todorov for aggressively protesting against the referee's decisions. Montana started to send more men forward (with goalkeeper Vasilev entering CSKA's penalty area for a corner kick in the fourth minute of added time), but clearcut chances were lacking until the end of the match and CSKA Sofia managed to hold on for the 1−0 win, becoming the first third division club to secure the Bulgarian Cup.

See also
2015–16 A Group

References

Bulgarian Cup finals
Cup Final
PFC CSKA Sofia matches